Der Teckbote is a German daily newspaper for the Swabian town of Kirchheim unter Teck.

History
The Teckbote was founded in 1832 under the title Wochenblatt für den Oberamtsbezirk Kirchheim unter Teck (Weekly Newspaper for the district of Kirchheim unter Teck).  It switched to a daily newspaper in 1869, focusing on the political and cultural life in Kirchheim unter Teck. After the Second World War ban on newspapers ended, it reappeared under the name Teck-Rundschau in 1949.

Since 1968, it has used Ulm-based Südwest Presse's outer jacket (Mantel).

External links
 Official Website

References

Daily newspapers published in Germany
German-language newspapers